Lee Seung-hyub (born October 31, 1992) is a South Korean rapper, singer, instrumentalist, songwriter, and actor. Lee officially debuted in 2013 and rose to prominence as the leader of the South Korean band N.Flying.

Career

Pre-debut 
Since 2013, Lee has been the leader South Korean band N.Flying, for whom he writes and composes, raps, sings, plays guitar and performs piano. N.Flying's debut was initially postponed in 2014 after he had sustained a knee injury.

2015: Jimin N J.don and Debut with N.Flying 
In April 2015, "God" was released as a collaboration between former AOA member Jimin and Seunghyub. The song was produced by Rhymer of Brand New Music as part of FNC Entertainment's N Project. The song's music video was based on Game of Thrones.

Lee made his official debut with N.Flying in South Korea on 20 May 2015.

During 2015, he modeled for clothing brand Buckaroo with Seolhyun of AOA. He also did a photoshoot for the magazine Nylon.

2016–2020: Television roles 
In 2016, Lee made a special cameo appearance in the South Korean drama Entertainer.

He made his web drama debut in the series All the Love in the World: Season 3, in which he portrayed as Dr. Lee Seung-hyub.

2021: Solo debut with On The Track 
On 22 February 2021, Lee made his solo debut with his debut single album On The Track and its lead single "Clicker", under the stage name J.Don.

2022: Original soundtrack 
Lee made his first solo appearance in original soundtrack. The track, entitled "Red Light", was the soundtrack for South Korean drama Tomorrow. Lee also wrote the lyrics for the said track.

Personal life
Lee revealed that he was ruled exempt from mandatory military enlistment due to two surgeries done for his knee injury sustained in 2014.

Discography

Single albums

Singles

Other appearances

Filmography

Television series

Web series

Television show

Endorsements

References

South Korean male rappers
South Korean male television actors
1992 births
South Korean male idols
Living people
FNC Entertainment artists
People from Daegu